Fernando Hernández may refer to:

Fernando Hernández (footballer), Costa Rican footballer
Fernando Hernández (baseball, born 1984), Major League Baseball pitcher 
Fernando Hernández (baseball, born 1971), former Major League Baseball pitcher
Fernando Hernández (equestrian) (born 1924), Mexican Olympic equestrian
Fernando Hernández (handballer) (born 1973), Spanish Olympic handball player
Fernando Hernández Leyva (born 1964), Mexican serial killer
Fernando Hernández Vega (1914–1988), Mexican military aviator
Fernando Hernández (volleyball), Cuban volleyball player